A callosity is another name for callus, a piece of skin that has become thickened as a result of repeated contact and friction.

Primates 

All Old World monkeys, gibbons, and some chimpanzees have pads on their rears known as ischial callosities. Ischial relates to the ischium: it forms the lower and back part of the hip bone.

The pads enable the monkeys to sleep sitting upright on thin branches, beyond reach of predators, without falling.

The ischial callosities are one of the most distinctive pelvic features which separates Old World monkeys from New World monkeys.

Right whales 

In whales, the term callosity refers to the rough, calcified skin patches found on the heads of the three species of right whales.  These callosities are a characteristic feature of the whale genus Eubalaena; because they are found on the head of the whale and appear white against the dark background of the whale's skin, they make it very easy to identify these species. The callosities themselves are grey; the white appearance is due to large colonies of whale lice, whale barnacles and parasitic worms which reside on them. Young whales and diseased individuals are often infested with a different species of cyamid, which gives an orange hue rather than white on these whales. Callosities arise naturally and are present even in late-term whale fetuses, although the work of lice digging into the surface of the skin may make them more jagged and hard over time.

Callosities are found on the upper surface of the whale's head, above the eyes, on the jawline and chin and surrounding the blowholes. Callosities form a unique pattern on every right whale and though callosities which are overgrown break off, the patterns do not change over a lifetime. This makes them a very useful tool for the purposes of photo-identification and conservation.

The evolutionary significance of callosities is unknown. Male right whales have a higher density of callosities than females. Males have been observed scratching one another with their callosities and it has been suggested by Payne & Dorsey (1983) that they are a sexually dimorphic feature, used for intra-specific sexual aggression. That explanation is not entirely satisfactory, because it does not account for the appearance of callosities in females. It has been proposed that the barnacles attached to callosities are important in helping fend off attacks by orcas.

See also 
 Callus

Notes

References
 
Callosities by Mason T. Weinrich in the Encyclopedia of Marine Mammals. .
A Dictionary of Zoology 1999, Oxford University Press 1999
"On Butts and Baboons". Artsibasheva, A.''  http://monkeybuiznezz.wordpress.com/2012/09/27/on-butts-and-baboons/

Cetaceans
Animal anatomy